Brigadistak Sound System is a studio album from Basque artist Fermin Muguruza. It was released in 1999 and produced by Esan Ozenki Records.

The title track refers to the International Brigades. Some themes featured in the other songs include globalisation, American imperialism and Basque nationalism. Most of the lyrics are sung in euskera. Almost every track is a collaboration with another artist or band. Tracks 3, 5 and 13 were recorded in Los Angeles (Cherokee Studios), tracks 6 and 12 in Azkarate, track 1 in Rome, track 2 in Caracas, track 4 in Biarritz, track 7 in Paris, track 8 in Barcelona, track 9 in Montreuil, track 10 in Havana, track 11 in Buenos Aires and track 14 in London.

Track listing
Urrun - with Radici nel Cemento
Hitza Har Dezagun - with Desorden Público
Newroz 
Puzka 
Harria - with Tijuana No
Lagun Nazakezu - with Hechos Contra el Decoro
Eguraldi Lainotsua Hiriburuan - with International Spartak
Maputxe - with Manu Chao
Brigadistak - with Alex from Inadaptats, Fernando from El Corazón del Sapo
Oasiko Erregina - with Amparanoia and Los Van Van
54-46 (Toots & the Maytals cover) - with Todos Tus Muertos
Ari Du Hotza 
Nazio Ibiltaria Naiz - with Aztlan Underground and Rodleen Getsic
Urrun Dub dubbed by Mad Professor

References

External links
Brigadistak Sound System at Muguruza's web page.
Brigadistak Sound System at Piranha Musik's catalogue

1999 albums
Fermin Muguruza albums